Don't Change Your Husband, also known as Kisses Once, is a 1929 Chinese drama film directed by Y.C. Zai (Xie Yunqing or Xie Yonglan) who also acted in the film. It is likely adapted from the Hollywood movie of the same name. Like most Chinese films from this period, it is a black-and-white silent film with both Chinese and English intertitles.

Plot
On the day he is laid off, Qiping receives a letter and discovers that his wife Lijun is in love with a rich college student named Chen Mengtian. He is infuriated. Lijun runs off to Chen's house, but sees Chen date another woman. Meanwhile, her mother receives the news from Qiping's angry mother and brings her home. Lijun's mother summons Chen to her house to discuss the matter. Soon Qiping receives a letter from a private attorney asking him to come in to sign the divorce papers. In the attorney's office, Qiping and Lijun are too emotional to finalize the divorce, but Qiping's mother and Chen sign the papers for them. Lijun feels inadequate with Chen, who is a playboy. Meanwhile, Qiping misses her dearly.

One day, Lijun's father returns home from business to celebrate his 50th birthday, oblivious that the divorce has happened. Lijun's mother invites Qiping to the banquet, and Qiping accepts. At the banquet, he sees Lijun for the first time after a long separation and becomes sad, which puzzles Lijun's father. Qiping finally reveals the truth to Lijun's father. At this time, Chen receives a letter from his father, who having gotten wind of his licentious ways, demands that he return to his hometown to get married. Chen thus abandons Lijun and his house. When Lijun's father arrives at Chen's house, Lijun has fainted.

A doctor assures Lijun's parents that her condition isn't serious. The father decides that the best solution is to reunite Qiping with Lijun, so he sends Lijun back to Qiping's house. When Lijun wakes up, she feels very ashamed before Qiping and his mother, so she runs away again. Qiping follows her to the beach, where Lijun tries to kill herself by jumping into the sea. Qiping stops her and declares that he still loves her. Lijun tells him how remorseful she feels.

Cast
Wang Naidong (Lyton Wong) as Qiping (Chi Ping)
Tang Tianxiu (T.S. Tong) as Lijun, Qiping's wife
Chen Yitang as Chen Mengtian (Chen Mong Tien), Lijun's lover
Yang Aizhen as Qiping's mother
Wang Xieyan as Lijun's mother
Xie Yunqing (Y.C. Zai) as Lijun's father
Cui Tiansheng as Attorney Cui (Attorney Chay, Attorney Tsai)
Wu Yixiao as Ah Fu (Ah Foh), a servant from Lijun's family

References

External links

1929 films
Films shot in Shanghai
Films set in Shanghai
Chinese silent films
Chinese drama films
1929 drama films
Chinese black-and-white films
Silent drama films